The PGA Tour of Australasia, currently titled as the ISPS Handa PGA Tour of Australasia for sponsorship reasons, is a professional golf tour for men, owned and operated by the PGA of Australia. Official events on the tour count for World Golf Ranking points. The tour is recognised as being founded in 1973 when the PGA of Australia instituted an Order of Merit. Despite always including at least one tournament in New Zealand, the tour was known as the PGA Tour of Australia until it adopted its current name in 1991 following the inclusion of three events in Asia.

Most of the leading players on the tour are Australian, with a smaller domestic contingent from New Zealand, but players from many other countries all over the world also participate. The very best Australasian players devote most of their time to the PGA Tour or the European Tour, typically returning home for events after the European and North American seasons end in mid-November, if they choose to play tournaments at home.  Therefore, the Australasian Tour is a feeder for the larger tours. Some of the leading events are co-sanctioned by the European Tour to encourage higher ranked players to enter and to attract more sponsorship. Players with a background on the tour who have reached the world top 20 since the turn of the Millennium include Steve Elkington and Adam Scott. The leading tournaments on the tour include the Australian Open, the Australian PGA Championship, the Australian Masters and the New Zealand Open.

In November 2005 it was reported by the BBC that the tour was going through difficult times, with the schedule for the 2005/06 summer season reduced to six events, three of them co-sponsored by other tours. The Heineken Classic, which was the richest event in Australasia in 2005, was cancelled in 2006 due to the withdrawal of the sponsor. One factor in the tour's problems is the rise of the nearby Asian Tour. Tour chairman Wayne Grady, and player Mark Hensby both accused Australia's biggest golf icon Greg Norman, who is a US resident, of not doing enough to support the tour. Norman dismissed their comments.

To earn a PGA Tour of Australasia card, one must place in the top 40 of the tour's qualifying school. To retain a Tour card, a golfer must finish in the top 60 of the Order of Merit. Golfers ranked 61st–75th are given conditional status and those ranked 61st to 100th are given entry to the final stage of Q School. Those outside the top 100 lose their Tour cards unless exempt by other means, such as top twenty on the career money list.

A win earns a two-year exemption for most events. Events considered Tier 1 are given three-year exemptions. Five-year exemptions are given to Order of Merit winners and the tour's three largest events (Australian PGA Championship, Australian Open, and Australian Masters). Entry to The Open Championship is given to the Order of Merit winner and the top three non-exempt players from the Australian Open.

Von Nida Tour
Between 2003 and 2008 the PGA Tour of Australasia ran a second-tier tour known as the Von Nida Tour (named after Australian golfer Norman Von Nida) which featured around ten events with purses in the region of A$100,000 each. The main tour events took place in the Southern Hemisphere summer, that is late one calendar year and early the next, while the Von Nida Tour events mainly took place in the local spring and autumn. However the money list was calculated for calendar years. From 2009, the Von Nida Tour has been merged into the PGA Tour of Australasia Tour.

Von Nida Tour Order of Merit winners

OneAsia Tour

In January 2009, it was announced that there would be a new series of events across the Asia-Pacific region, to be organised by the PGA Tour of Australasia in co-operation with China Golf Association, the Japan Golf Tour, the Korean Golf Association and the Korean PGA. The aim of these events would be to raise the profile of professional golf in the region, and compete with the likes of the European Tour. The series would initially consist of six events, three in China, two in Australia and one in South Korea, with plans to expand to at least thirteen in 2010 as events in Japan were added, and over 20 by 2011.

The introduction of the OneAsia series has not been universally welcomed, with strong opposition coming from the Asian Tour in particular, with support from its members. All of the six events announced for 2009 were existing tournaments, including some already sanctioned by the Asian Tour. One of them, the Pine Valley Beijing Open, was called off a few weeks before it was due to be held. The organisers officially attributed this decision to the state of the course and a clash of dates with The Players Championship on the US-based PGA Tour, but some media commentators dismissed these reasons since the tournament had clashed with the Players Championship the previous year as well, and attributed the cancellation to sponsor discontent with the sanctioning changes.

OneAsia was discussed at the annual meeting of the International Federation of PGA Tours during the 2009 Masters Tournament. The Series would need to become a member of the Federation if it wishes to be able to award Official World Golf Ranking points in its own right. Points are currently available in all events due to those conferred by the PGA Tour of Australasia and the European Tour, as the Chinese and Korean tours are not Federation members. Under present arrangements it is unlikely that any new tournaments launched by OneAsia will receive ranking points, and could prove difficult to attract top players without them. At the meeting OneAsia and the Asian Tour both claimed that the game's powerbrokers understood the strength of their case, but neither received any public endorsements from the others members.

Schedule

PGA Tour of Australasia events have mainly been held in Australia and New Zealand although in past seasons, tournaments that have been co-sanctioned with other tours, such as the Johnnie Walker Classic, have been held in several other countries, including India and Thailand.

There was a significant increase in the number of regular season tournaments in 2009, following the integration of the former Von Nida Tour events. Typically, only tournaments that were on the tour schedule prior to the merger were eligible for world ranking points. Beginning in 2012, all events will carry world ranking points, with the "State Based and Regional Tournaments" receiving a minimum of 6 points, compared with 16 points for regular events. The tour's flagship event, the Australian Open, awards a minimum of 32 points to the winner.

The tour's richest events are those that are co-sanctioned by the larger global tours, such as the European Tour. The Australian Open, Australian PGA Championship and Fiji International have also maintained elevated prize funds as part of the OneAsia Tour.

Australian Triple Crown
In Australia, the Triple Crown also refers to winning the three major domestic championships, the Australian Open, the Australian Masters and the Australian PGA Championship. Winning all three titles in the same season is a feat only achieved by Robert Allenby in 2005.

Order of Merit winners

Awards

References

External links
Professional Golfers Association of Australia (Official site)
 ISPS HANDA PGA Tour of Australasia (Official site)

 
Australasia
Golf in Australia
Golf in New Zealand
1973 establishments in Australia
International Sports Promotion Society